Íslandspóstur or simply Pósturinn is the national postal service of Iceland. It dates back to the year 1776 when Christian VII, king of Denmark (and at the time also Iceland) ordered a mail service to be established in the country. Two years later, regular postal sailings began between Iceland and Denmark, once a year. The first Icelandic postage stamps were published in 1873, and at the same time, the Icelandic postal system was being organised under a special board and the first post offices being established. In 1935, the postal service and the national telephone company were merged under the name Póstur og sími (Post and telephone). In 1998, that governmental company was split up into two companies, Landssími Íslands (the telephone company) and Íslandspóstur. Landssími Íslands has since been privatized. Íslandspóstur has one of the greatest numbers of employees in Iceland, at nearly 1,200. Many new post offices throughout the country are being planned to widen the distribution net and better the services of the company.

Íslandspóstur is a member of the Small European Postal Administration Cooperation.

Services 
Besides other services Íslandspóstur offers a different service than the basic postal service and often it is in competition with the private sector.
 Domestic mail (airplanes and cars always used; no service by boats or ships anymore)
 International mail. Couriers who are offered through TNT Express Transport
 Flyer. Driver comes with loads and shipments in the company at predetermined times.
 Lottery tickets. Iceland Post is a proxy for the various lotteries in several places in the countryside.
 The number of contracts. Recipient signs a contract in the presence of a qualified person mail. After signing purchase agreements are still sent to the sender.
 Printing services. After Communication Ltd. became a subsidiary of Iceland has been printing services part of the company's services.
 Publication Services. According to the law on civil postman may publish trends and other manifestations in a manner similar strategy witness.
 Same day dispatch.
 Message Services.
 Customs brokers. Customs brokers of Iceland themselves to finalize the customs declarations and other staff for the importation of goods.
 Packaging. Íslandspóstur provides and sells cardboard boxes and envelopes.
 Other products. At post offices offer a variety of other products such as writable CDs and greeting cards.

See also
Postage stamps and postal history of Iceland

External links
  Official website

Iceland
Logistics companies of Iceland
Postal system of Iceland
Philately of Iceland
1776 establishments in Europe